The 2014 Canadian Wheelchair Curling Championship was held from April 28 to May 4 at the Centre de curling Boucherville in Boucherville, Quebec.

Teams
The teams are listed as follows:

Round-robin standings
Final round-robin standings

Round-robin results
All draw times are listed in Eastern Daylight Time (UTC−4).

Draw 1
Monday, April 28, 18:00

Draw 2
Tuesday, April 29, 10:00

Draw 3
Tuesday, April 29, 15:00

Draw 4
Wednesday, April 30, 10:00

Draw 5
Wednesday, April 30, 15:00

Draw 6
Thursday, May 1, 10:00

Draw 7
Thursday, May 1, 15:00

Draw 8
Friday, May 2, 10:00

Draw 9
Friday, May 2, 15:00

Tiebreakers
Friday, May 2, 20:00

Playoffs

1 vs. 2
Saturday, May 3, 14:00

3 vs. 4
Saturday, May 3, 18:00

Semifinal
Sunday, May 4, 10:00

Gold medal game
Sunday, May 4, 14:30

References

External links

Curling competitions in Quebec
2014 in Canadian curling
Boucherville
2014
April 2014 sports events in Canada
May 2014 sports events in Canada